HWA Team, also known as HWA RACELAB, is the auto racing team of HWA AG, a German company based in Affalterbach, that also develops and builds vehicles and components for Mercedes-AMG race cars. It is named after founder Hans-Werner Aufrecht.

History 
HWA was responsible for managing the AMG Mercedes team in the Deutsche Tourenwagen Masters (DTM). HWA AG was founded in 1999, and takes its name from Hans-Werner Aufrecht, who established AMG in 1967. Towards the end of 1998 Aufrecht sold a majority interest in AMG to DaimlerChrysler AG. As part of the process, the motor racing department and parts of the customised vehicles construction business were spun off and transferred to HWA AG.

Between 1998 and 1999, HWA carried out the production of the Mercedes Benz CLR-GTR Straßenversion, building 20 cars with a further six roadster models built from spare parts in 2002.

It was announced on 9 May 2018 that HWA would join Formula E for the 2018-19 season. Their drivers were to be Gary Paffett, their reigning DTM champion and former McLaren Formula One driver Stoffel Vandoorne. For the 2019-20 season, Mercedes joined Formula E in an official capacity by taking over the HWA entry and renaming it to Mercedes-EQ Formula E Team.

In October 2018, HWA was named as one of ten teams that would make up the grid for the inaugural season of the newly rebranded FIA Formula 3 Championship. In January 2019, the team entered into a partnership with Arden International for the FIA Formula 2 Championship. On 16 October 2019 it was announced that HWA would take over Arden's entry completely for the 2020 Season following their withdrawal. The following month, the team named incumbent Arden driver Artem Markelov as their first driver.

In October 2021 was announced that HWA will leave the FIA Formula 3 Championship after three seasons, during which they claimed four wins and 10 podiums. Their assets were purchased by Van Amersfoort Racing.

Racing results

FIA Formula E Championship

Notes
 † – Driver did not finish the race, but was classified as he completed over 90% of the race distance.
 * – Season still in progress.

FIA Formula 2 Championship

In detail
(key) (Races in bold indicate pole position) (Races in italics indicate fastest lap)

FIA Formula 3 Championship

In detail
(key) (Races in bold indicate pole position) (Races in italics indicate fastest lap)

* Season still in progress

Notes

Timeline

References

External links



German auto racing teams
Motor vehicle engine manufacturers
Deutsche Tourenwagen Masters teams
German racecar constructors
Engine manufacturers of Germany
FIA Formula 2 Championship teams
FIA Formula 3 Championship teams
Formula E teams
Mercedes-Benz in motorsport
Auto racing teams established in 1999
1999 establishments in Germany